Najafabad (also Romanized as Najafābād) is a village in Eqbal-e Sharqi Rural District, in the Central District of Qazvin County, Qazvin Province, Iran. At the 2006 census, its population was 1,348, in 347 families.

References 

Populated places in Qazvin County